Meeting Spencer is a 2011 film directed by Malcolm Mowbray and written by Andrew Delaplaine. It has a 36% on Rotten Tomatoes based on 11 reviews. After a series of Hollywood flops, famed director Harris Chappell returns to New York to relaunch his Broadway career. But Chappell's triumphant comeback begins to spiral out of control into a wild night of comic misadventure after meeting struggling actor Spencer and his old flame Didi.

Cast
 Jeffrey Tambor as Harris Chappell
 Jesse Plemons as Spencer West
 Don Stark as Wolfie
 Yvonne Zima as Sophia Martinelli
 William Morgan Sheppard as Larry Lind
 Jill Marie Jones as Nikki Ross

References

External links
 

2011 films
2011 comedy films
American comedy films
Films directed by Malcolm Mowbray
2010s English-language films
2010s American films